Barnwell School is a coeducational secondary school and sixth form that was established in 1959 and is situated in the south of Stevenage, Hertfordshire.

Between 2002 and 2005 it was the most improved school in Hertfordshire and one of the most improved schools in England. The overall pass rate this year is 48 per cent for grades A to C — a one per cent increase on year before, but still below the national average by far.

In September 2006 the school expanded by taking in the students from another nearby school that closed (Collenswood). As a consequence, the school now has two campuses: Barnwell Upper Campus (the original Barnwell site) and, less than a mile away, Barnwell Middle Campus (formerly the site of Collenswood School).

The school was designated as a Business and Enterprise College in September 2004 due to having an emphasis on maths, business and IT.

Barnwell podcast 
Barnwell School decided that it needed a way to get information across to students while they are enjoying the information and introduced a podcast, that was available to students online. This was launched in October 2007. Sometime between its launch and 2015 the podcast was discontinued, in 2020 a group of Year 12 students attempted to resurrect it.

Extended schools
Barnwell School has been designated the hub school for South Stevenage Consortium of Extended Schools. The consortium consists of 8 schools plus a federation: 
Barnwell School  
Peartree Spring Junior School 
Peartree Spring Infant School 
Peartree Way Nursery School 
Featherstone Wood Primary School 
Roebuck Academy 
St Margaret's Primary School 
Shephalbury Meadow Federation (Longmeadow Primary School & Shephalbury Primary School)

Schools in Stevenage
Secondary schools in Hertfordshire
Educational institutions established in 1959
1959 establishments in England
Foundation schools in Hertfordshire